Bradley Barker (January 18, 1883 – September 29, 1951) was an American actor and film director of the silent era. He also created sound effects for film and radio. 

Born in Long Island, New York, Barker was a vaudeville performer and an actor in stock theater. He appeared in 70 films between 1915 and 1928. He also directed seven films between 1929 and 1930. 

After he worked as an actor, Barker began creating sound effects for radio programs and films. He provided the sound of the MGM lion on screen before the studio began using a recording of a real lion and provided sounds of a variety of animals on radio. Radio programs on which he worked included Let's Pretend and Little Orphan Annie. 

On September 29, 1951, Barker died at his home in New York City at age 68.

Selected filmography

 What Happened to Jones (1915)
 The Moth and the Flame (1915)
 The House with Nobody in It (1915)
 The Little Gypsy (1915)
 The Jury of Fate (1917)
 Little Miss Fortune (1917)
 Billy and the Big Stick (1917)
 The Road Between (1917)
 The Eyes of Mystery (1918)
 Men (1918)
 A Woman's Experience (1919)
 Erstwhile Susan (1919)
 Wanted: A Husband (1919)
 The Master Mind (1920)
 Away Goes Prudence (1920)
 The Fear Market (1920)
 Devotion (1921)
 Silas Marner (1922)
 The Secrets of Paris (1922)
 The Leavenworth Case (1923)
Twenty-One (1923)
 Into the Net (1924)
 Playthings of Desire (1924)
 The Man Without a Heart (1924)
 The Live Wire (1925)
 Ermine and Rhinestones (1925)
 The Crackerjack (1925)
 The Police Patrol (1925)
 False Pride (1925)
 The Early Bird (1925)
 Rainbow Riley (1926)
 The Brown Derby (1926)
 The Potters (1927)
 His Rise to Fame  (1927)  
 Combat (1927)
 Inspiration (1928)
 Mother's Boy (1929)

References

External links

1883 births
1951 deaths
American male film actors
American male silent film actors
American film directors
American male radio actors
Male actors from New York (state)
20th-century American male actors